Parliamentary elections were held in Colombia on 10 March 2002 to elect the Senate and Chamber of Representatives. The Liberal Party remained the largest party but lost its majority in both houses, winning won 56 of the 166 seats in the Chamber and 29 of the 102 seats in the Senate.

Results

Senate

Chamber of Representatives

References

Parliamentary elections in Colombia
Colombia
2002 in Colombia
Election and referendum articles with incomplete results